The Alliance of Bakongo (or ABAKO) was a Congolese political party, founded by Edmond Nzeza Nlandu, but headed by Joseph Kasa-Vubu, which emerged in the late 1950s as vocal opponent of Belgian colonial rule in what today is the Democratic Republic of the Congo. Additionally, the organization served as the major ethno-religious organization for the Kongo people (also known as Bakongo) and became closely intertwined with the Kimbanguist Church which was extremely popular in the lower Congo.

Because of its long exposure to the West and rich heritage of messianic unrest, the lower Congo region, homeland of the Kongo people, was the first area to emerge as a focal point of militantly anti-Belgian sentiment and activity. ABAKO and Kasa-Vubu spearheaded ethnic nationalism there and in 1956 issued a manifesto calling for immediate independence. 

The move came about as a response to a far more conciliatory statement by a group of intellectuals from other ethnic groups identified with the editorial committee of a Léopoldville newspaper, Conscience Africaine ("African Consciousness"). In it they gave their full endorsement to the ideas set forth by Belgian professor A. A. J. Van Bilsen in his 1955 essay, the Thirty-Year Plan for the Political Emancipation of Belgian Africa, sometimes known as the Van Bilsen Plan. Far more impatient in tone and radical in its objectives, the ABAKO manifesto stated: "Rather than postponing emancipation for another thirty years, we should be granted self-government today."

The metamorphosis of ABAKO into a major vehicle of anti-colonial sentiment unleashed considerable unrest throughout the lower Congo region. In the capital city of Léopoldville (present-day Kinshasa) the party emerged as the dominant force: in the municipal elections of December 1957 ABAKO candidates won 133 out of 170 seats on the communal council, giving unfettered control of African communes into the hands of the party which advocated "complete independence." While the party's victory at the polls greatly strengthened its bargaining position in relation to the colonial administration, in the countryside its local sections quickly proliferated, creating a de facto power structure almost entirely beyond the control of the colonial civil servants.

In Léopoldville, meanwhile, the situation was rapidly getting out of hand. The turning point came on 4 January 1959, when Belgian administrators took the fatal step of dispersing a large crowd of ABAKO supporters gathered to attend a political meeting. The move led to widespread rioting around the city, resulting in the wholesale plunder of European-owned property. When order was finally restored, at the price of an exceedingly brutal repression, 49 Congolese were officially reported killed and 101 wounded. A week later, on 13 January, the Belgian government formally recognized independence as the ultimate goal of its policies. "It is our firm intention," King Baudouin I solemnly announced, "without undue procrastination, but without fatal haste, to lead the Congolese forward to independence in prosperity and peace." Although no precise date was set for independence, the tide of nationalist sentiment could not be stemmed, and a year later, the Belgian Congo proclaimed independence.

Its anti-Belgian orientation notwithstanding, ABAKO was first and foremost an ethnic movement of the Kongo people. Its concentration on the past splendors of the pre-colonial Kongo Kingdom and the cultural value of the Kikongo language were entirely aligned with its proclaimed objective of working toward the reconstruction of the Kongo polity, and, at one point, of advocating secession as the quickest way of achieving this all-consuming goal. 

Thus, while ABAKO militancy inspired other groups of Africans to emulate its demands for immediate independence, another consequence that came along with it was the structuring of political competition along ethnic lines. In Léopoldville, the ethnic Kongo elements soon came into conflict with groups of Lingala-speaking people from the interior; in 1959 and 1960 this rivalry became a major point of contention between the forces of ethno-regionalism and the claims of territorial nationalism.

The party never exhibited a systematic political program other than promoting immediate independence. Following independence, members of ABAKO held prominent roles; Joseph Kasa-Vubu became the country's first president (1960–1965). Daniel Kanza, the vice-president of ABAKO, became the first non-white mayor of Kinshasa (1960–62), while his son, Thomas Kanza, one of the first Congolese people with a university degree, became a member of the Lumumba Government and served as ambassador to the United Nations (1960–62) and later as ambassador to the United Kingdom (1962–64).

ABAKO was eventually dissolved in 1966 when the authoritarian presidential-type regime led by Joseph-Désiré Mobutu, based on single-party rule by his Popular Movement of the Revolution (MPR), was established. 

A small political party in modern-day Congo, the Alliance of Builders of Kongo (Alliance des Bâtisseurs du Kongo) also uses the acronym ABAKO as an homage to the original group's legacy. They won three National Assembly seats in the 2006 general election and two seats in the 2011 election.

References

 .

Defunct political parties in the Democratic Republic of the Congo
Politics of the Democratic Republic of the Congo